Sìn Hồ is a rural district of Lai Châu province in the Northwest region of Vietnam. There are various ethnic minorities of people such as the Mong and Dao.

As of 2019, the district had a population of 83,643. The district covers an area of 1,526.96 km². The district capital lies at Sìn Hồ.

The district is subdivided to 22 commune-level subdivisions, including Sìn Hồ township and the rural communes of Căn Co, Chăn Nưa, Hồng Thu, Làng Mô, Lùng Thàng, Ma Quai, Nậm Cha, Nậm Cuổi, Nậm Hăn, Nậm Mạ, Nậm Tăm, Noong Hẻo, Pa Khóa, Pa Tần, Phăng Sô Lin, Phìn Hồ, Pu Sam Cáp, Sà Dề Phìn, Tả Ngảo, Tả Phìn and Tủa Sín Chải.

References

Districts of Lai Châu province